Dorcadion lugubre is a species of beetle in the family Cerambycidae. It was described by Kraatz in 1873. It is known from Greece, Bulgaria, Albania, and North Macedonia.

References

lugubre
Beetles described in 1873